Houchens Industries is an American employee-owned company, in business since 1917 when it began as a small grocery operated by founder Ervin Houchens in rural Barren County, Kentucky. The company is headquartered in Bowling Green, Kentucky. The company currently operates more than 325 retail grocery, convenience, and neighborhood market stores across 14 states, through their Houchens Food Group subsidiary. Complemented by a strong foundation of diverse companies and over 15,000 employees corporate-wide, Houchens Industries is listed by Forbes as one of the largest 100% employee-owned companies in the world.

History

The company traces its beginnings to 1917, when founder Ervin Houchens opened his first store ("BG Wholesale") at the age of 19 in a shed in Lucas, Kentucky. This shed, along with other historical structures, has been well preserved and is open to the public. He sold the company in 1983. The current CEO, Jimmie Gipson, started with the company in 1965, as an accountant.

In 2004, Houchens acquired Food Giant, which operated mainly in the Midwest. Later that year, Houchens bought Scotty's Contracting & Stone, a large paving contractor, aggregates producer and construction company based in Bowling Green. 

In 2007, the company sold its Commonwealth Brands subsidiary, the fourth-largest cigarette producer in the United States, to the British company Imperial Tobacco Group PLC for $1.9 billion. It had acquired the company from its founder Brad Kelley in 2001; it was the first time that Houchens had sold one of its acquisitions.

Diversification continued in 2007 when Houchens announced that it would acquire Hilliard Lyons, a full-service stock broker and investment firm based in Louisville, from PNC Financial Services. The sale was completed in March 2008.

In January 2008, Houchens announced that it would acquire 14 convenience stores which sell Shell Oil products from Bowling Green businessman Jerry Browning. The stores are located in Bowling Green and surrounding towns.

In April 2008, Buehler Foods of Jasper, Indiana, signed a letter of intent to sell the company to Houchens.

In July 2008, Houchens acquired juice maker Tampico Beverages.

In January 2010, White's Fresh Foods, in the Tri-Cities, Tennessee area sold their local grocery chain to Houchens. Those stores currently operate as Price Less Foods.

In January 2020, during a Board of Directors meeting, Jimmie Gipson, after nearly 55 years of service with the company, announced his retirement effective March 31, 2020. The board of directors has elected Executive Vice President Dion Houchins to succeed Jimmie as the chief executive officer and chairman of the board.

In April 2021, Houchens Industries announced the acquisition of Lee Masonry Product LLC. Lee Masonry Products, Inc. was established by Ray Lee in Frankfort, Kentucky in 1963 and became a 100% employee-owned company in 2006. Lee Masonry is a manufacturer of concrete block and specialty concrete products and a distributor of clay masonry products for commercial and residential use. Through both acquisition and the addition of new production facilities, Lee Masonry has grown to operate 19 facilities in two states with over 400 employees.

Other
The company has been completely owned by its employee stock ownership plan (ESOP) since 1988. Employees select members of the board of directors and vote on the sale of any substantial assets.
Houchens Industries sponsors the annual Kentucky High School Athletic Association's Girls' "Sweet 16" Basketball Championship Tournament, held annually at WKU's E.A. Diddle Arena.
Houchens also contributes heavily to the community, most notably Western Kentucky University, even having acquiring naming rights to WKU's football home, Houchens Industries-L. T. Smith Stadium in Bowling Green.

References

External links
 Hoovers.com factsheet

Supermarkets of the United States
Tobacco companies of the United States
Construction and civil engineering companies of the United States
Employee-owned companies of the United States
Companies based in Kentucky
Retail companies established in 1918
1918 establishments in Kentucky
Bowling Green, Kentucky
Privately held companies based in Kentucky